Raya, also known as the Municipality of Raya, is a town in North Sumatra province of Indonesia and it is the seat (capital) of Simalungun Regency.

Climate
Pematang Raya has a tropical rainforest climate (Af) with heavy rainfall year-round. The temperatures are moderated by its elevation.

References

Populated places in North Sumatra
Regency seats of North Sumatra